is a junction passenger railway station located in Minami-ku, Saitama, Saitama Prefecture, Japan, operated by East Japan Railway Company (JR East).

Lines
Minami-Urawa Station is served by the Keihin-Tōhoku Line linking Saitama Prefecture with central Tokyo and Kanagawa Prefecture, and the orbital Musashino Line. Many Keihin-Tōhoku services originate and terminate at this station. The station is located 31.7 kilometers from Fuchūhommachi Station on the Musashino Line.

Station layout
The station consists of two island platforms for the Keihin-Tōhoku Line, serving four tracks, with two opposed elevated side platforms for the Musashino Line located above and at a right angle to the island platforms. The station building is elevated and is located on a mezzanine level in between the two sets of platforms. The station has a Midori no Madoguchi staffed ticket office.

Platforms

History
The station opened on July 1, 1961 on the Keihin-Tōhoku Line. The Musashino Line platforms opened on April 1, 1973 when passenger services on the line started. A widely reported incident occurred at the station about 9:15 a.m. on July 22, 2013, when a woman fell into the gap between a train and the edge of the platform. About 40 bystanders helped station staff push against the side of the train so that the woman could be safely extricated. A member of the station staff began pushing the train after the woman fell into the gap and bystanders quickly joined in to help with the rescue effort. The woman was not seriously injured.

Passenger statistics
In fiscal 2019, the station was used by an average of 60,144 passengers daily (boarding passengers only). The passenger figures for previous years are as shown below.

See also
 List of railway stations in Japan

References

External links

 JR East station information 

Railway stations in Saitama Prefecture
Keihin-Tōhoku Line
Musashino Line
Railway stations in Saitama (city)
Railway stations in Japan opened in 1961